Priscus of Panium (410s AD/420s AD-after 472 AD) was a 5th-century Eastern Roman diplomat and Greek historian and rhetorician (or sophist).

Biography
Priscus was born in Panion (located in Thrace) between 410 and 420 AD. In 448/449 AD, he accompanied Maximinus, the head of the Byzantine embassy representing Emperor Theodosius II (r. 402–450), on a diplomatic mission to the court of Attila the Hun. While there, he met and conversed with a Greek merchant, dressed in "Scythian" (or Hunnic) fashion, who was captured eight years earlier when the city of Viminacium (located on the Danube east of modern-day Belgrade) was sacked by the Huns. The trader explained to Priscus that after the sack of Viminacium, he was a slave of Onegesius, a Hunnic nobleman, but obtained his freedom and chose to settle among the Huns. Priscus ultimately engaged in a debate with the Greek defector regarding the qualities of life and justice in both the Byzantine Empire and in barbarian kingdoms.

After an interlude in Rome, Priscus traveled to Alexandria and the Thebaid in Egypt. He last appeared in the East, circa 456, attached to the staff of Euphemios as Emperor Marcian's (r. 450–457) magister officiorum. He died after 472 AD.

History of Byzantium
Priscus was the author of an eight-volume historical work, written in Greek, entitled the History of Byzantium (Greek: Ἱστορία Βυζαντιακή), which was probably not the original title name. The History probably covered the period from the accession of Attila the Hun to the accession of Emperor Zeno (r. 474–475), or from 433 up until 474 AD. Priscus's work currently survives in fragments and was very influential in the Byzantine Empire. The History was used in the Excerpta de Legationibus of Emperor Constantine VII Porphyrogenitus (r. 913–959), as well as by authors such as Evagrius Scholasticus, Cassiodorus, Jordanes, and the author of the Souda. Priscus's writing style is straightforward and his work is regarded as a reliable contemporary account of Attila the Hun, his court, and the reception of the Roman ambassadors. He is considered a "classicizing" historian to the extent that his work, though written during the Christian era, is almost completely secular and relies on a style and word-choice that are part of an historiographical tradition dating back to the fifth century BC.

Priscus account of a dinner with Attila the Hun

Priscus recounted the story of a dinner with Attila the Hun which took place at one of Attila's many houses. This house was said to be greater than the rest (having been made for celebration) due to it being constructed of decorative polished wood, with little thought to making any part of the place for defense. The dinner was at three o’clock; Priscus entered the house bearing gifts to Attila's wife; her name was Kreka and she had three sons. Priscus and the embassy of Eastern Romans were placed at the end of the table farthest from Attila but still in his presence; this was meant to show that he was greater than the Roman guests, and that Attila considered his people to be more important than Priscus and the Roman embassy. As Priscus and the Eastern Roman embassy stood, they followed the cultural tradition of being served tea from the cupbearers; they were to pray and have a drink before having a seat at the table. The seats were arranged parallel to the walls; Attila sat on the middle couch. The right side of Attila was reserved for his honored Chiefs, and everyone else including Priscus and the Roman embassies sat on the left. After being seated, everyone raised a glass to pledge one another with wine. Once the cupbearers left another attendant came in with a platter of meat, followed by bread and other foods of the time. All of the food was served onto plates of silver and gold. Priscus also notes that Attila didn't use any silver or gold plates but instead used a cup made of wood; also, his attire was not very grand. Once the first round was finished, they stood and drank again to the health of Attila. When evening arrived torches were lit and songs that were about Attila's victories were sung.

Priscus in fiction
Priscus is an important character in Slave of the Huns by Geza Gardonyi.  He is depicted as a kindly master and scholar, and part of the novel is based on his account of his visit to Attila.

Remaining works 
The remaining works of Priscus are currently published in four collections:

References

Citations

Sources

Further reading

External links

Georgetown University: "Priscus at the Court of Attila" (Translation by J. B. Bury)

5th-century Byzantine historians
Byzantine diplomats
5th-century diplomats